Karl Gildemeister (11 October 1820 – 8 February 1869) was a German architect.

Life 
Gildemeister was born in Bremen, where he was first apprenticed to his relative, the Bremen J. E. Polzin.  In 1843 he enrolled at the Karlsruhe Polytechnic School, later transferring to the Berliner Bauakademie; there followed study trips to Italy and Greece. In the wake of the revolution of 1848 he emigrated to New York where in collaboration with Georg Carstensen he designed the New York Crystal Palace which was part of the Exhibition of the Industry of All Nations in New York City.  His business affected by the Depression of 1857, he returned to Germany, where he taught at the commercial art school in Bremen until his early death there. He is known for his detailed historical study of the Bremen Town Hall and Marketplace.

Family
He was the son of Senator Johann Carl Friedrich Gildemeister; the brother of Mayor Otto Gildemeister, also a translator and journalist; and stepson of the architect Jakob Ephraim Polzin.

References
 Lewis, Michael J., “Der Rundbogenstil und die Karlsruhe-Philadelphia Achse,” in Dauer und Wechsel: Festschrift für Harold Hammer-Schenk (Berlin: Lukas Verlag, 2004), .
 Herbert Schwarzwälder, Das Große Bremen-Lexikon (2 vols.), 2, Bremen, 2003, .

External links
 

1820 births
1869 deaths
20th-century German architects
Architects from Bremen
19th-century German architects